Charlotte Entrican Paul (born 1948) is a New Zealand doctor, epidemiologist and emeritus professor at the University of Otago.

Early life and education 
Paul was born in 1948, the second daughter of publishers Janet and Blackwood Paul and sister of the artist Joanna Paul. She completed her PhD at the University of Otago in 1992.

Career 
Paul is an emeritus professor in the Department of Preventive and Social Medicine at the University of Otago. Her fields of research have included HIV/Aids, women's cancers, screening, contraception and epidemiology. She directed the Aids Epidemiology Group for 20 years, monitoring HIV/Aids in New Zealand.

Personal life 
Paul is married to Kevin Cunningham.

Selected works 

 Paul, Charlotte (12 October 2011) 'Keep the ethical safeguards in medical research' New Zealand Herald
 Paul, Charlotte (December 2019) 'Epidemics expose public health failures' Newsroom.
 Paul, Charlotte (17 May 2020) 'Covid-19 and the common good'. The Spinoff

References

External links 
 Photo of the Paul family in Te Ara, ca 1959

1948 births
Living people
University of Otago alumni
Academic staff of the University of Otago
New Zealand epidemiologists
New Zealand women academics
New Zealand public health doctors
Entrican family
Women public health doctors
Women epidemiologists